Saint-Christaud is the name of several communes in France:

 Saint-Christaud, Haute-Garonne in the Haute-Garonne department
 Saint-Christaud, Gers, in the Gers department